Nathan Green (born 8 June 1992) is an English footballer who plays for Folkestone Invicta as a defender and midfielder. In the 2014–15 season, he played in the Football League for Dagenham & Redbridge.

Career
Green was born in Bermondsey and represented the Bermondsey & Rotherhithe PSFA district as a schoolboy.

He started his career in the Youth system at Croydon Athletic, before breaking into the first team in 2008 whilst still in the youth team. In January 2010, he joined Isthmian League Division One South side Chipstead on loan, where he gained invaluable experience. After he returned to the club in March 2010, he was part of the Croydon side that won the title and gained promotion to the Isthmian League Premier Division.

In November 2010 he signed for Conference South side Lewes, where he was reunited with manager Tim O'Shea, who had previously managed him at Croydon.

He stayed with the Rooks for a season before transferring to fellow Conference South side Bromley in August 2011. In January 2012, he was released by Bromley, however his registration was retained.

Shortly after, he dropped to the Isthmian League Premier Division signing for Billericay Town, helping them to the league title at the end of the season. Following promotion, he was a regular for Billericay in the Conference South before joining Isthmian League Premier Division Kingstonian on loan in December 2012. He returned to Billericay at the end of the month.

In January 2013, he joined Conference South side Tonbridge Angels on a free transfer. During his time with the Angels he featured regularly in the first team, however, he could not save the side from relegation to the Isthmian League in his first full season with the club.

In June 2014, he signed for Football League Two side Dagenham & Redbridge for an undisclosed fee, signing a one-year contract.
He made his professional debut for Dagenham & Redbridge in a 2–0 defeat to Northampton Town in September 2014, replacing George Porter as a substitute. However, he struggled to cement a regular place in the first team and in November 2014 he was sent out on loan to Conference South side St Albans City on a one-month loan after just eight appearances for the club. He made his debut in the 1–1 draw with Wealdstone in the FA Trophy, scoring a late equalising goal with a spectacular thirty-yard effort. Green returned to Dagenham at the end of December having made six appearances for the club. In January 2015, his contract was terminated by Dagenham and he left the club by mutual consent having only made eight appearances for the first team.

He immediately joined Conference Premier side Dartford on a six-month contract until the end of the season. He made his debut for the club the next day in the 2–1 home defeat to Kidderminster Harriers.

In June 2015, he rejected a new contract offer from relegated side Dartford and signed for newly promoted National League South side Margate on a free transfer.

After one season with Margate, Green joined Dulwich Hamlet of the Isthmian League Premier Division ahead of the 2016–2017 season. He went on to score his first goal for the club against Metropolitan Police in a 1–1 away draw on 20 September 2016, before going on to score his second goal with the opener against Chesham United in a 4–0 home FA Trophy victory on 12 November 2016. He left Dulwich to join Welling United in June 2019.

In June 2022, Green joined Folkestone Invicta from Cray Valley Paper Mills.

Career statistics

Honours
Croydon Athletic
Isthmian League Division One South champions: 2009–10

Billericay Town
Isthmian League Premier Division champions: 2011–12

References

External links

 Nathan Green at Dulwich Hamlet F.C.

1992 births
Footballers from Bermondsey
Living people
English footballers
Association football forwards
Croydon Athletic F.C. players
Chipstead F.C. players
Lewes F.C. players
Bromley F.C. players
Billericay Town F.C. players
Kingstonian F.C. players
Tonbridge Angels F.C. players
Dagenham & Redbridge F.C. players
St Albans City F.C. players
Dartford F.C. players
Margate F.C. players
Dulwich Hamlet F.C. players
Welling United F.C. players
Cray Valley Paper Mills F.C. players
Folkestone Invicta F.C. players
English Football League players
National League (English football) players
Isthmian League players